The manga Sekirei is a seinen series created by Sakurako Gokurakuin. This manga has nineteen released volumes in tankōbon form in Japan.



Volume list

References

Sekirei